Palynology is the "study of dust" (from , "strew, sprinkle" and -logy) or of "particles that are strewn". A classic palynologist analyses particulate samples collected from the air, from water, or from deposits including sediments of any age. The condition and identification of those particles, organic and inorganic, give the palynologist clues to the life, environment, and energetic conditions that produced them.

The term is commonly used to refer to a subset of the discipline, which is defined as "the study of microscopic objects of macromolecular organic composition (i.e., compounds of carbon, hydrogen, nitrogen and oxygen), not capable of dissolution in hydrochloric or hydrofluoric acids". It is the science that studies contemporary and fossil palynomorphs (paleopalynology), including pollen, spores, orbicules, dinocysts, acritarchs, chitinozoans and scolecodonts, together with particulate organic matter (POM) and kerogen found in sedimentary rocks and sediments. 

Palynology does not include diatoms, foraminiferans or other organisms with siliceous or calcareous exoskeletons.

Definition
A classic palynologist analyses particulate samples collected from air, water, sediments or rocks of any age. The condition and identification of those particles, organic and inorganic, give the palynologist clues to the life, environment, and energetic conditions that produced them.

The term is commonly used to refer to a subset of the discipline, which has been described as "the study of microscopic objects of macromolecular organic composition (i.e., compounds of carbon, hydrogen, nitrogen and oxygen), not capable of dissolution in hydrochloric or hydrofluoric acids".

It is the science that studies contemporary and fossil palynomorphs, including pollen, spores, orbicules, dinocysts, acritarchs, chitinozoans and scolecodonts, together with particulate organic matter (POM) and kerogen found in sedimentary rocks and sediments.

Palynology as an interdisciplinary science stands at the intersection of earth science (geology or geological science) and biological science (biology), particularly plant science (botany). Stratigraphical palynology, a branch of micropalaeontology and paleobotany, studies fossil palynomorphs from the Precambrian to the Holocene.

Palynomorphs
 
Palynomorphs are broadly defined as organic-walled microfossils between 5 and 500 micrometres in size.  They are extracted from sedimentary rocks and sediment cores both physically, by ultrasonic treatment and wet sieving, and chemically, by chemical digestion to remove the non-organic fraction. Palynomorphs may be composed of organic material such as chitin, pseudochitin and sporopollenin. Palynomorphs that have a taxonomy description are sometimes referred to as palynotaxa.

Palynomorphs form a geological record of importance in determining the type of prehistoric life that existed at the time the sedimentary formation was laid down. As a result, these microfossils give important clues to the prevailing climatic conditions of the time. Their paleontological utility derives from an abundance numbering in millions of cells per gram in organic marine deposits, even when such deposits are generally not fossiliferous. Palynomorphs, however, generally have been destroyed in metamorphic or recrystallized rocks.

Typically, palynomorphs are dinoflagellate cysts, acritarchs, spores, pollen, fungi, scolecodonts (scleroprotein teeth, jaws and associated features of polychaete annelid worms), arthropod organs (such as insect mouthparts), chitinozoans and microforams. Palynomorph microscopic structures that are abundant in most sediments are resistant to routine pollen extraction including strong acids and bases, and acetolysis, or density separation.

Palynofacies
A palynofacies is the complete assemblage of organic matter and palynomorphs in a fossil deposit. The term was introduced by the French geologist André Combaz in 1964. Palynofacies studies are often linked to investigations of the organic geochemistry of sedimentary rocks. The study of the palynofacies of a  sedimentary depositional environment can be used to learn about the depositional palaeoenvironments of sedimentary rocks in exploration geology, often in conjunction with palynological analysis and vitrinite reflectance.

Palynofacies can be used in two ways:
 Organic palynofacies considers all the acid insoluble particulate organic matter (POM), including kerogen and palynomorphs in sediments and palynological preparations of sedimentary rocks. The sieved or unsieved preparations may be examined using strew mounts on microscope slides that may be examined using a transmitted light biological microscope or ultraviolet (UV) fluorescence microscope. The abundance, composition and preservation of the various components, together with the thermal alteration of the organic matter is considered.
 Palynomorph palynofacies considers the abundance, composition and diversity of palynomorphs in a sieved palynological preparation of sediments or palynological preparation of sedimentary rocks. The ratio of marine fossil phytoplankton (acritarchs and dinoflagellate cysts), together with chitinozoans, to terrestrial palynomorphs (pollen and spores) can be used to derive a terrestrial input index in marine sediments.

History

Early history
The earliest reported observations of pollen under a microscope are likely to have been in the 1640s by the English botanist Nehemiah Grew, who described pollen and the stamen, and concluded that pollen is required for sexual reproduction in flowering plants.

By the late 1870s, as optical microscopes improved and the principles of stratigraphy were worked out, Robert Kidston and P. Reinsch were able to examine the presence of fossil spores in the Devonian and Carboniferous coal seams and make comparisons between the living spores and the ancient fossil spores. Early investigators include Christian Gottfried Ehrenberg (radiolarians, diatoms and dinoflagellate cysts), Gideon Mantell (desmids) and Henry Hopley White (dinoflagellate cysts).

1890s to 1940s
Quantitative analysis of pollen began with Lennart von Post's published work. Although he published in the Swedish language, his methodology gained a wide audience through his lectures. In particular, his Kristiania lecture of 1916 was important in gaining a wider audience. Because the early investigations were published in the Nordic languages (Scandinavian languages), the field of pollen analysis was confined to those countries. The isolation ended with the German publication of Gunnar Erdtman's 1921 thesis. The methodology of pollen analysis became widespread throughout Europe and North America and revolutionized Quaternary vegetation and climate change research.

Earlier pollen researchers include Früh (1885), who enumerated many common tree pollen types, and a considerable number of spores and herb pollen grains. There is a study of pollen samples taken from sediments of Swedish lakes by Trybom (1888); pine and spruce pollen was found in such profusion that he considered them to be serviceable as "index fossils". Georg F. L. Sarauw studied fossil pollen of middle Pleistocene age (Cromerian) from the harbour of Copenhagen. Lagerheim (in Witte 1905) and C. A.Weber (in H. A. Weber 1918) appear to be among the first to undertake 'percentage frequency' calculations.

1940s to 1989

The term palynology was introduced by Hyde and Williams in 1944, following correspondence with the Swedish geologist Ernst Antevs, in the pages of the Pollen Analysis Circular (one of the first journals devoted to pollen analysis, produced by Paul Sears in North America). Hyde and Williams chose palynology on the basis of the Greek words paluno meaning 'to sprinkle' and pale meaning 'dust' (and thus similar to the Latin word pollen).

Pollen analysis in North America stemmed from Phyllis Draper, an MS student under Sears at the University of Oklahoma. During her time as a student, she developed the first pollen diagram from a sample that depicted the percentage of several species at different depths at Curtis Bog. This was the introduction of pollen analysis in North America; pollen diagrams today still often remain in the same format with depth on the y-axis and abundances of species on the x-axis.

1990s to the 21st century 
Pollen analysis advanced rapidly in this period due to advances in optics and computers. Much of the science was revised by Johannes Iversen and Knut Fægri in their textbook on the subject.

Methods of studying palynomorphs

Chemical preparation
Chemical digestion follows a number of steps.  Initially the only chemical treatment used by researchers was treatment with Potassium hydroxide (KOH) to remove humic substances; defloculation was accomplished through surface treatment or ultra-sonic treatment, although sonification may cause the pollen exine to rupture. In 1924, the use of hydrofluoric acid (HF) to digest silicate minerals was introduced by Assarson and Granlund, greatly reducing the amount of time required to scan slides for palynomorphs. Palynological studies using peats presented a particular challenge because of the presence of well-preserved organic material, including fine rootlets, moss leaflets and organic litter. This was the last major challenge in the chemical preparation of materials for palynological study. Acetolysis was developed by Gunnar Erdtman and his brother to remove these fine cellulose materials by dissolving them. In acetolysis the specimen is treated with acetic anhydride and sulfuric acid, dissolving cellulistic materials and thus providing better visibility for palynomorphs.

Some steps of the chemical treatments require special care for safety reasons, in particular the use of HF which diffuses very fast through the skin and, causes severe chemical burns, and can be fatal.

Another treatment includes kerosene flotation for chitinous materials.

Analysis
Once samples have been prepared chemically, they are mounted on microscope slides using silicon oil, glycerol or glycerol-jelly and examined using light microscopy or mounted on a stub for scanning electron microscopy.

Researchers will often study either modern samples from a number of unique sites within a given area, or samples from a single site with a record through time, such as samples obtained from peat or lake sediments. More recent studies have used the modern analog technique in which paleo-samples are compared to modern samples for which the parent vegetation is known.

When the slides are observed under a microscope, the researcher counts the number of grains of each pollen taxon.  This record is next used to produce a pollen diagram. These data can be used to detect anthropogenic effects, such as logging, traditional patterns of land use or long term changes in regional climate

Applications 
Palynology can be applied to problems in many scientific disciplines including geology, botany, paleontology, archaeology, pedology (soil study), and physical geography:

 Biostratigraphy and geochronology. Geologists use palynological studies in biostratigraphy to correlate strata and determine the relative age of a given bed, horizon, formation or stratigraphical sequence.
Because the distribution of acritarchs, chitinozoans, dinoflagellate cysts, pollen and spores provides evidence of stratigraphical correlation through biostratigraphy and palaeoenvironmental reconstruction, one common and lucrative application of palynology is in oil and gas exploration.
 Paleoecology and climate change. Palynology can be used to reconstruct past vegetation (land plants) and marine and Freshwater phytoplankton communities, and so infer past environmental (palaeoenvironmental) and palaeoclimatic conditions in an area thousands or millions of years ago, a fundamental part of research into climate change.
 Organic palynofacies studies, which examine the preservation of the particulate organic matter and palynomorphs provides information on the depositional environment of sediments and depositional palaeoenvironments of sedimentary rocks.
 Geothermal alteration studies examine the colour of palynomorphs extracted from rocks to give the thermal alteration and maturation of sedimentary sequences, which provides estimates of maximum palaeotemperatures.
 Limnology studies. Freshwater palynomorphs and animal and plant fragments, including the prasinophytes and desmids (green algae) can be used to study past lake levels and long term climate change.
 Taxonomy and evolutionary studies. Involving the use of pollen morphological characters as source of taxonomic data to delimit plant species under same family or genus. Pollen apertural status is frequently used for differential sorting or finding similarities between species of the same taxa. This is also called Palynotaxonomy.
 Forensic palynology: the study of pollen and other palynomorphs for evidence at a crime scene.
 Allergy studies and pollen counting. Studies of the geographic distribution and seasonal production of pollen, can be used to forecast pollen conditions, helping sufferers of allergies such as hay fever.
 Melissopalynology: the study of pollen and spores found in honey.
 Archaeological palynology examines human uses of plants in the past. This can help determine seasonality of site occupation, presence or absence of agricultural practices or products, and 'plant-related activity areas' within an archaeological context.  Bonfire Shelter is one such example of this application.

See also
 Aperture (botany)
 Aeroplankton

References

Sources 
Moore, P.D., et al. (1991), Pollen Analysis (Second Edition). Blackwell Scientific Publications. 
Traverse, A. (1988), Paleopalynology. Unwin Hyman. 
Roberts, N. (1998), The Holocene an environmental history, Blackwell Publishing.

External links
 The AASP - The Palynological Society
 International Federation of Palynological Societies
Palynology Laboratory, French Institute of Pondicherry, India
 The Palynology Unit, Kew Gardens, UK
 PalDat, palynological database hosted by the University of Vienna, Austria
 The Micropalaeontological Society
 Commission Internationale de Microflore du Paléozoique (CIMP), international commission for Palaeozoic palynology.
 Centre for Palynology, University of Sheffield, UK
 Linnean Society Palynology Specialist Group (LSPSG)
 Canadian Association of Palynologists
 Pollen and Spore Identification Literature
 Palynologische Kring, The Netherlands and Belgium
 Palynofacies, an annotated link directory.
 Acosta et al., 2018. Climate change and peopling of the Neotropics during the Pleistocene-Holocene transition. Boletín de la Sociedad Geológica Mexicana. http://boletinsgm.igeolcu.unam.mx/bsgm/index.php/component/content/article/368-sitio/articulos/cuarta-epoca/7001/1857-7001-1-Acosta

 
Earth sciences
Archaeological science
Subfields of paleontology
Microfossils
Branches of botany
Sedimentology